Entomophaga is a genus of flies in the family Tachinidae. It was reviewed by T. Tachi and H. Shima in 2006 and was found to be paraphyletic; it was also found to form a monophyletic group with Proceromyia.

Species
E. exoleta (Meigen, 1824)
E. nigrohalterata (Villeneuve, 1921)
E. sufferta (Villeneuve, 1942)
E. ussuriensis Tachi & Shima, 2006
E. vernalis Tachi & Shima, 2006

References

Tachininae
Tachinidae genera
Taxa named by Paolo Lioy